Hydra Head Records was an independent record label specializing in extreme metal music, founded in New Mexico by Aaron Turner (the frontman of Isis) in 1993. It had another imprint, Hydra Head Noise Industries, which specialized in experimental and noise music. Turner announced he was winding the label down in 2012. In 2020, the label removed its catalog from Spotify and returned its album rights back to several artists.

History
Hydra Head was founded in 1993 as a distribution company while Turner was still in high school. In 1995, he moved to Boston to attend art school. In late 1995, he was handed a demo by local band Vent. That seven-inch single would be the first record released on Hydra Head. The label grew to accommodate local bands such as Roswell, Corrin, Piebald, and Converge, and after Turner graduated from college in 1999, it became a full-time endeavor. In 2011, Hydra Head relocated to Los Angeles, California, from its former home in Boston, Massachusetts.

Some of the bands signed to the label include Cave In, Xasthur, Kayo Dot, Boris, and Jesu. Its discography includes Botch, Khanate, and Harkonen, who were active at the time of their signings.

On September 11, 2012, Turner announced the "imminent demise of Hydra Head Records", stating that Hydra Head would take its first steps into shutdown "this December, at which point we are cutting off new releases from the label." The label would continue to stay operational, maintaining its back catalogue to pay off its "rather sizeable debts." The label released Worship is the Cleansing of the Imagination, a split album between JK Flesh & Prurient.

The Hydra Head office in Los Angeles was closed in May 2013.

In 2017, Hydra Head released Oxbow's Thin Black Duke, a long-germinating album that was slated to come out on Hydra Head and had been unable to find another label since Hydra Head's winding down. Discussing the album, Turner appeared open to releasing more albums "on a case-by-case basis". 

In a 2018 interview, Turner expressed disinterest in doing Hydra Head as a full time label again, saying that "...it would mean me stopping a lot of other things that I’m currently doing, and I don’t want to do that." 

The label released Final Transmission by Cave In, released on June 7, 2019.

In 2020, the label's catalogue was removed from Spotify, and the album rights to several of the label's bands were given back to the artists. Several artists such as Cave In, Discordance Axis and Botch signed to other record labels such as Relapse, Willowtip and Sargent House, respectively, to help reissue their back catalogue.  A press release on Botch's signing to Sargent House stated that Hydra Head had folded in 2020. 

As of April 2022, the label continued to sell its remaining stock via Bigcartel.com.

Current roster 

27
Agoraphobic Nosebleed
The Austerity Program
Big Business
Black Face
Boris
Cable
Cave In
Cavity
Craw
Dälek
Daughters
Discordance Axis
Drawing Voices
Everlovely Lightningheart
Greymachine
Gridlink
Harkonen
Harvey Milk
Helms Alee
Heresi
Jesu
Kayo Dot
Keelhaul
Khanate
Khlyst
Knut
Logh
Lotus Eaters
Lustmord
Mamiffer
Merzbow
Nihill
The Octave Museum
Oxbow
Pet Genius
Phantomsmasher
Pyramids
Torche
Xasthur
Zozobra

Tortuga
The Gersch
Old Man Gloom
Scissorfight
5ive
Tusk

Past artists 

The Abandoned Hearts Club
Age of Reason
Barbaro
Botch
Boxer Rebellion
Buzzov*en
Cattlepress
Coalesce
Converge
Corrin
Cult of Luna
The Dillinger Escape Plan
Drowningman
Isis
Jesuit
Kid Kilowatt
Mare
Miltown
Neurosis
Pelican
Piebald
Roswell
Seven Day Curse
Six Going on Seven
SOHNS
Soilent Green
Sunn O)))
The Hollomen
The Never Never
These Arms Are Snakes
Today Is the Day
Unionsuit
Vent

See also 
 Hydra Head Records discography
 Southern Lord Records

References

External links 
 Official site
 Interview with Aaron Turner

American independent record labels
Record labels established in 1993
Alternative rock record labels